The canoe polo events at the 2009 World Games in Kaohsiung was played between 17 and 18 July. 96 athletes, from 9 nations, participated in the tournament. The competition took place at Lotus Pond.

Participating nations

Medal table

Events

References

External links
 Planet Canoe
 Canoe polo on IWGA website
 Results

 
2009 World Games
2009